Francisco Bollini (born 1888, date of death unknown) was an Argentine fencer. He competed in the individual épée competition at the 1924 Summer Olympics.

References

External links
 

1888 births
Year of death missing
Argentine male fencers
Argentine épée fencers
Olympic fencers of Argentina
Fencers at the 1924 Summer Olympics